This is an inclusive list of science fiction television programs whose names begin with the letter Z.

Z
Live-action
Z Nation (2014-2018, US) 
Zack Files, The (2000–2002, Canada)
Zombieland (2013, pilot)
Zontar, The Thing from Venus aka Zontar: The Invader from Venus (1966, film)

Animated
Zegapain (2006, Japan, animated)
Zentrix (2003–2004, Hong Kong, animated)
Zeta Project, The (2001–2002, animated)
Zetman (2012, Japan, animated)
Zevo-3 (2010–2011, animated)
Zillion aka Red Photon Zillion (1987, Japan, animated)
Zixx (2004–2009, Canada, partly animated)
Zorro: Generation Z (2008–2009, Germany, animated)

References

Television programs, Z